is a railway station in Higashi-ku, Fukuoka, Japan.

Adjacent Stations

Lines 
 Nishi-Nippon Railroad (Nishitetsu)
 Kaizuka Line

Station layout 
The station is above ground level with an island platform and two tracks.

Tracks

Railway stations in Fukuoka Prefecture
Railway stations in Japan opened in 1986